Euphorbia lividiflora is a species of plant in the family Euphorbiaceae. It is found in Malawi, Mozambique, Tanzania, and Zimbabwe. It is threatened by habitat loss.

References

lividiflora
Vulnerable plants
Taxonomy articles created by Polbot